Sherif Salama Hasan (born on 12 July 1979 in Cairo) is an Egyptian actor. He began his career in 1998

Life
He was born into an artistic family. His father Salama Hasan is a theater director, and his older sister Manal Salama is an actress. He completed his study in the Higher Institute of Theatrical Arts and subsequently began work as a photographer. His first role in acting was in A woman from the time of love TV series in 1998. His most famous roles were in Morgan ahmed morgan in 2007 with Adel Emam and Basma, Spies war in 2009 with Menna Shalabi and Bassem Yakhour, Thieves trap in 2009, The door in the door in 2011, Napoleon and Mahroosa in 2012 with Laila Elwi, The sin in 2014 with Shery Adel, Misunderstanding in 2015 with Cyrine Abdelnour, The black box in 2020 with Mona Zaki, Light black in 2020 with Haifa Wehbe, Shiqqa 6 in 2021, He is married to actress Dalia Mostafa, they have two children together.

Works

Films

TV series

References

External links
 Sherif Salama in IMDb

1979 births
Living people
20th-century Egyptian male actors
21st-century Egyptian male actors
Egyptian male film actors
Egyptian male television actors
Male actors from Cairo